Alexander Magan (born September 25, 1993) is a Dutch curler. He is currently the alternate on the Dutch men's curling team skipped by Wouter Gösgens.

Teams

Men's

Mixed doubles

References

External links
 

1993 births
Living people
Dutch male curlers
Place of birth missing (living people)
20th-century Dutch people
21st-century Dutch people